Schinnen is a railway station located in Schinnen, Netherlands. The station was opened on 1 May 1896 and is located on the Sittard–Herzogenrath railway. Train services are operated by Arriva.

Train services
The following local train services call at this station:
Stoptrein: Sittard–Heerlen–Kerkrade

External links
NS website 
Dutch public transport travel planner 

Railway stations in Limburg (Netherlands)
Railway stations opened in 1896
1896 establishments in the Netherlands
Beekdaelen
Railway stations in the Netherlands opened in the 19th century